Andrey Nikolaevich Novosadov (born 27 March 1972) is a Russian association football coach and a former goalkeeper.

Club career
He is the only goalkeeper to score a goal in Russian Premier League.

International
He capped for USSR U-20 team at 1991 FIFA World Youth Championship.

Honours
 Russian Second Division Zone Center best goalkeeper: 2004.

External links

1972 births
Footballers from Moscow
Living people
Association football goalkeepers
Soviet footballers
Soviet Union youth international footballers
Russian footballers
Russia under-21 international footballers
Russia international footballers
PFC CSKA Moscow players
FC Moscow players
FC Lokomotiv Nizhny Novgorod players
FC Fakel Voronezh players
FC KAMAZ Naberezhnye Chelny players
Russian Premier League players
Russian football managers